{{DISPLAYTITLE:C19H21N5O2}}
The molecular formula C19H21N5O2 (molar mass: 351.40 g/mol, exact mass: 351.1695 u) may refer to:

 CP-135807
 Pirenzepine (Gastrozepin)